VfL Oldenburg is a German women's handball club from the town of Oldenburg, Lower Saxony.

Honours
German Cup 
Winners (4): 1981, 2009, 2012, 2018
 German Supercup 
Winners (1): 2009
EHF Challenge Cup 
Winners (1): 2008

European record

Team

Current squad
Squad for the 2022-23 season

Goalkeepers
 1  Julia Renner
 12  Nele Reese
 28  Sophie Fasold
Wingers 
RW
 17  Maike Schirmer
LW
 3  Lana Teiken
 5  Kim Birke
 13  Jane Martens
Line player
 14  Marie Steffen
 18  Lena Feinler

Back players 
LB
 15  Merle Carstensen
 23  Paulina Golla
CB
 4  Toni-Luisa Reinemann
 10  Catherine Pichlmeier
RB 
 9  Marloes Hoitzing
 24  Luisa Knippert

Transfers 
Transfers for the 2023-24 season.

Joining
  Emilia Ronge (RW) (from  Bayer 04 Leverkusen)
  Lisa Borutta (RB) (from  Frisch Auf Göppingen)
  Madita Kohorst (GK) (from  Borussia Dortmund Handball)

Leaving 
  Maike Schirmer (RW) (Retires)

References

External links
VfL Oldenburg official website

German handball clubs
Handball clubs established in 1894
1894 establishments in Germany
Sport in Oldenburg (city)
VfL Oldenburg